Wales Island may refer to:

 Wales Island (British Columbia)
 Wales Island (Nunavut)
 Wales Island (Ungava), also part of Nunavut

See also
 Prince of Wales Island (disambiguation)